Artevalencia is a non-profit association based in Benicàssim, where different artists, but with the same objective, get together. Searching new means of expression is a constant feature of artists. The association is born with the objective of getting current artists together with new artistic impressions, and support the promotion of their work. In 2013 the association is registered as a volunteering entity, which allows to develop a Cultural Volunteer Program that provides an opportunity to those people with cultural curiosity so that they can join and take part in Artevalencia.

Objectives 
 Organise and perform cultural activities for a higher development and a wider cultural diffusion of the Valencian Community, Spain
 Training through courses and conferences
 Promotion of artists from the Valencian Community
 Integration of people with functional diversity in art
 Promotion of volunteering

Projects 

 Exhibition of Contemporary Art - Artevalencia
 100% Diversity, Art without Barriers

References

Links 
 Artevalencia Association
 Artevalencia Art Show - Benicàssim

Cultural organisations based in Spain
Spanish artist groups and collectives
2011 establishments in Spain